Thiokol (variously Thiokol Chemical Corporation(/Company), Morton Thiokol Inc., Cordant Technologies Inc., Thiokol Propulsion, AIC Group, ATK Thiokol, ATK Launch Systems Group; finally Orbital ATK before becoming part of Northrop Grumman) was an American corporation concerned initially with rubber and related chemicals, and later with rocket and missile propulsion systems. Its name is a portmanteau of the Greek words for sulfur (θεῖον "theion") and glue (κόλλα "kolla"), an allusion to the company's initial product, Thiokol polymer.

The Thiokol Chemical Company was founded in 1929. Its initial business was a range of synthetic rubber and polymer sealants. Thiokol was a major supplier of liquid polymer sealants during World War II. When scientists at the Jet Propulsion Laboratory discovered that Thiokol's polymers made ideal binders for solid rocket fuels, Thiokol moved into the new field, opening laboratories at Elkton, Maryland, and later production facilities at Elkton and at Redstone Arsenal in Huntsville, Alabama. Huntsville produced the XM33 Pollux, TX-18 Falcon, and TX-135 Nike-Zeus systems. It closed in 1996. In the mid-1950s the company bought extensive lands in Utah for its rocket test range. 

During its existence, Thiokol was involved in two notable loss of life incidents. On February 3, 1971, at a Thiokol chemical plant southeast of Woodbine, Georgia, a fire entered a storage facility holding nearly five tons of ignition pellets, flares, and other highly flammable materials. The facility exploded, killing 29 people and severely wounding more than 50 others, including many with severed limbs. Windows were shattered 11 miles (18 km) from the site and the explosion was heard for 50 miles (80 km) around. Georgia law prevented employees from suing their employer because they were covered by workers' compensation insurance.

On January 28, 1986, the Space Shuttle Challenger exploded 73 seconds into its flight, killing all seven crew members aboard. An investigation found the cause was two O-ring seals in the Space Shuttle's right solid rocket booster, which had been manufactured by Morton Thiokol. Test data from as early as 1977 had revealed a potentially catastrophic flaw in the O-rings in low-temperature situations, but neither Morton Thiokol nor NASA addressed or corrected the issue. Shortly before takeoff, several Morton Thiokol engineers recommended calling off the launch until temperatures at Cape Canaveral increased, but they were overruled by company management.

Company history

1926: Two chemists, Joseph C. Patrick and Nathan Mnookin, were trying to invent an inexpensive antifreeze. In the course of an experiment involving ethylene dichloride and sodium polysulfide, they created a gum whose outstanding characteristic was a terrible odor. The substance clogged a sink in the laboratory, and none of the solvents used to remove it were successful. Then the frustrated chemists realized that the resistance of the material to any kind of solvent was a useful property. They had invented a synthetic rubber, which they christened "Thiokol".
1929: Bevis Longstreth, an executive at a salt company, founds the Thiokol Corporation in Trenton, New Jersey. He becomes its president and general manager.
1944: Longstreth dies, leaving the position of president and general manager open. William Crosby becomes general manager.
1945: Charles Bartley, working for the nascent Jet Propulsion Laboratory, discovers the use of thiokol as a stabilizer in solid-fuel rockets.
1948: Elkton, Maryland, plant opens, producing solid rocket motors.
1949: Thiokol produces the TX-18 Falcon missile, the world's first solid-fueled missile system.
1957: In anticipation of the forthcoming Minuteman contract, the company builds its plant at Brigham City, Utah.
1957: Thiokol Huntsville builds XM33 Pollux missile.
1958: Thiokol merges with Reaction Motors Inc. (RMI), makers of liquid propellant rocket motor systems.
1958: Thiokol receives contract to build the TU-122 rocket motor for the first stage of the LGM-30 Minuteman ICBM system.
1959: Thiokol Huntsville produces CASTOR strap-on booster rocket, used on the Atlas rocket.
1964: Woodbine, Georgia plant is constructed to build solid propellant motors for NASA, but the agency changes course and uses liquid fuel.
1969: Thiokol awarded U.S. Army contract to manufacture 750,000 Tripflares for use in the Vietnam War.
1971: Explosion in magnesium flare assembly facility at Woodbine plant kills 29 and injures 50.
1974: Thiokol wins the contract to build the solid rocket booster (SRB) for the Space Shuttle (Nov 29, 1973).
1975: Thiokol succeeds Sperry Rand as operator of the large Louisiana Army Ammunition Plant near Minden, Louisiana.
1978: The company sells its ski lift division to CTEC and its snow equipment division to Logan Manufacturing Company (LMC), owned by John DeLorean.
1980: Thiokol acquires Carlisle Chemical Company of Cincinnati, Ohio.
1982: Thiokol merges with Morton-Norwich products (owners of the Morton Salt concern, the Simoniz automotive products brand, and various chemical concerns). The merged company is called Morton Thiokol Incorporated (MTI).
1986: An O-ring fault in an MTI SRB destroys Space Shuttle Challenger in flight. The company was found at fault for the destruction of Challenger and deaths of the astronauts, as a direct causality from pressure from NASA to launch, based on inconclusive evidence of O-ring failure, while under freezing temperatures. (see Space Shuttle Challenger disaster).

1989: Morton Thiokol splits, with most of the chemical concern going with Morton. The propulsion systems division becomes Thiokol Inc.
1998: Thiokol changes name to Cordant Technologies.
1998: Thiokol branded polymer products purchased by PolySpec L.P., a Houston-based manufacturer of industrial coatings, marine decking, and subsea insulation products.
2000: Thiokol merges with two divisions of Alcoa and with Howmet Castings and Huck Fasteners to become AIC Group (Alcoa Industrial Components).
2001: Alliant Techsystems (ATK) Inc. (a company formed when Honeywell spun off its defense division) spends $2.9 billion buying Thiokol and related businesses from AIC/Alcoa. ATK built the third stage of the Trident missile and had earlier bought Hercules Aerospace Co., builder of the second stage. With the purchase of Thiokol, makers of the missile's first stage, ATK controls the lion's share of the US solid rocket-fuel market.
2005: ATK-Thiokol wins the contract to produce the Ares I launch vehicle first stage for NASA's Project Constellation. 
2006: Alliant Techsystems (ATK) Inc. renamed ATK-Thiokol to ATK Launch Systems Group.
2014: Orbital ATK is formed from the merger of Orbital Sciences Corporation and parts of Alliant Techsystems.
2018: Orbital ATK is purchased by Northrop Grumman.

Products

Products made by the aerospace divisions of RMI and Thiokol include motors used in Subroc, the Pershing missile, the Peacekeeper missile, Poseidon missile, Minuteman missile, and the Trident I and Trident II missiles. Thiokol produces powerplants for numerous U.S. military missile systems, including AIM-9 Sidewinder, AGM-88 HARM, AGM-65 Maverick, AGM-69 SRAM, and AIR-2 Genie.

Thiokol also produced a variety of liquid and solid rocket motors for the US space program, including deorbit motors for the Mercury and Gemini programs, rocket stages and separation rocket motors for the Apollo program, motors for the Pioneer, Surveyor, Viking, Voyager, and Magellan missions, updated CASTOR boosters for the Delta rocket, and the Space Shuttle Solid Rocket Booster. Reaction Motors powerplants propelled the X-1 and X-15 aircraft, and later Thiokol technologies were also used in the private Tier One crewed spaceplane. On March 1, 2006, NASA announced that Thiokol will be the prime contractor for the new Crew Launch Vehicle (CLV), to be known as the Ares I, which will put the Orion spacecraft (formerly known as the "Crew Exploration Vehicle") into low Earth orbit, along with the five-segment SRBs for the heavy-lift Cargo Launch Vehicle (CaLV), known as the Ares V.

In addition to ski lifts, Thiokol produced a range of equipment for ski resorts including snowcats and snow grooming vehicles. These businesses were spun off in 1978 when the company restructured itself to concentrate on its rocket products and related technologies. John Z. DeLorean purchased the Thiokol snowcat operation and renamed it DMC. DMC continued to manufacture snowcats until 1988, when the company was renamed LMC. LMC continued making snowcats for 12 more years but ceased operations in 2000. Thiokol produced snow vehicles with a wide range of capabilities and duties. The company also produced several utility based vehicles based on their snowcat tracked vehicle, in addition to larger snow grooming machines suitable for use on steep ski-slopes. Thiokol machines were used in ski resorts, operated by the USAF in Alaska and other northern regions, and are now popular with private owners as dependable snowcats and for all-terrain transport.

Thiokol pioneered the short-burn rocket motors used in aircraft ejection seats. The company also produced a number of the earliest practical airbag systems, building the high-speed sodium azide exothermic gas generators used to inflate the bags. Thiokol bags were first used in U.S. military aircraft, before being adapted to space exploration (Mars Pathfinder bounced down on Mars on Thiokol airbags) and automotive airbags. Thiokol's generators form the core of more than 60% of airbags sold worldwide.

See also
 Antarctic snow cruiser
 Bombardier Recreational Products
 Snow coach
 Tucker Sno-Cat

References

External links
 Northrop Grumman homepage
 History of Reaction Motors Inc.
 History of Thiokol
 Photographs of Thiokol snowcat and snow-grooming equipment

Manufacturing companies based in Utah
Chemical companies established in 1929
Alliant Techsystems
Rocket engine manufacturers of the United States
Tracked vehicles
Snowmobiles
Aerospace companies of the United States
Brigham City, Utah
1929 establishments in Utah
Manufacturing companies established in 1929
Space Shuttle Challenger disaster